Arachis cardenasii  is a herb in the Fabaceae family. This plant is cited as gene sources for research in plant biology of peanut (Arachis hypogaea); for example, Cercospora leaf spot resistance.

References

cardenasii